The 1964 German Grand Prix was a Formula One motor race held at Nürburgring on 2 August 1964. It was race 6 of 10 in both the 1964 World Championship of Drivers and the 1964 International Cup for Formula One Manufacturers. The 15-lap race was won by Ferrari driver John Surtees after he started from pole position. Graham Hill finished second for the BRM team and Surtees's teammate Lorenzo Bandini came in third. The race was marred by the death of Dutch gentleman racer Carel Godin de Beaufort during practice. The embankment at the Karussell had been eliminated and replaced with grass and a wheel-wide tarmac strip at the bottom of the concrete banking.

Classification

Qualifying

Race

Championship standings after the race 

Drivers' Championship standings

Constructors' Championship standings

 Notes: Only the top five positions are included for both sets of standings.

References

External links 
 1964 German Grand Prix at statsf1.com
 1964 German Grand Prix at grandprix.com

German Grand Prix
German Grand Prix
German Grand Prix